The Cape Government Railways Type C 0-4-0T Midget of 1902 was a South African steam locomotive from the pre-Union era in the Cape of Good Hope.

In 1902, the Cape Government Railways placed a single  narrow gauge steam locomotive in service on the Avontuur branch. In 1912, this locomotive was assimilated into the South African Railways and renumbered. It was sold to the West Rand Consolidated Mines near Krugersdorp in 1921.

Manufacturer
The locomotive was built and delivered by Manning Wardle and Company in 1902, with works number 1583. Named Midget, it was designated Type C and numbered 41 on the Cape Government Railways (CGR). The locomotive was delivered with an open cab, roofed, but not enclosed. To offer better protection to the crew, a spectacle plate and enclosed sides were added at some point soon after it entered service.

Service

Cape Government Railways
The engine Midget was placed in service on the Avontuur branch out of Port Elizabeth, where it was employed on construction work and as shunting engine. It was also used to haul short two-coach passenger trains, based on the light railways premise that a light engine on low-volume passenger service would reduce running costs by 50% compared to larger locomotives.

The locomotive is reputed to have worked light two-carriage suburban passenger trains on the Walmer branch in Port Elizabeth at half the cost of the Type A and Type B locomotives. It was therefore possible to cater for traffic which, with the larger engines, would have been unremunerative.

South African Railways
When the Union of South Africa was established on 31 May 1910, the three Colonial government railways (CGR, Natal Government Railways and Central South African Railways) were united under a single administration to control and administer the railways, ports and harbours of the Union. Although the South African Railways and Harbours came into existence in 1910, the actual classification and renumbering of all the rolling stock of the three constituent railways were only implemented with effect from 1 January 1912.

In 1912, the locomotive was renumbered to no. NG20 on the South African Railways (SAR), with the letters NG identifying it as a narrow gauge locomotive in the SAR registers. In 1921, it was sold to the West Rand Consolidated Mines in Krugersdorp.

Preservation
Upon eventually being withdrawn from service at the mines, the engine Midget was placed in storage until the Crown Mines Museum was established south of Johannesburg. The locomotive was restored, renamed Taffy and worked at Gold Reef City, as the museum was later named, until it was eventually retired once more and placed on static display at the museum.

Illustration
The following pictures show the engine Taffy in service at Gold Reef City in January 1982.

References

0460
0460
0-4-0T locomotives
B locomotives
Manning Wardle locomotives
2 ft gauge locomotives
Railway locomotives introduced in 1902
1902 in South Africa